Scortum barcoo is a species of fish in the family Terapontidae, known by the common names Barcoo grunter and jade perch. It is endemic to Australia, where it can be found in certain major rivers, including the Barcoo River. It is reared in hatcheries.

Description
This fish has a sturdy body and a small head. The body is brownish with darker blotches and darker fins. The fish reaches a maximum length of about 50 cm.

Biology
The fish is omnivorous. Prey items include crustaceans, insects, molluscs, and fish.

Floods may trigger breeding in the wild fish.

References

Freshwater fish of Australia
barcoo
Fish described in 1917